Different Pulses is the first solo studio album of Israeli artist Asaf Avidan after the split-up of his band "Asaf Avidan and the Mojos". The album containing 11 tracks was released in Israel on Telmavar Records in 2012 with a European release in 2013 on Polydor-Universal Music.

Track list
"Different Pulses" (4:30)
"Setting Scalpels Free" (3:41)
"Love It or Leave It" (4:30)
"Cyclamen" (4:02)
"613" (4:00)
"Thumbtacks in My Marrow" (3:27)
"Conspiratory Visions of Gomorrah" (5:24)
"A Gun & a Choice" (3:17)
"Turn" (4:05)
"The Disciple" (4:49)
"Is This It?" (3:40)

Charts

References

2012 albums